Communalness, as suggested by Robert A. Freitas Jr., is a level of an emergent phenomenon which originates from electronic sentience, and represents a broader mode of thinking than just normal consciousness. While consciousness is limited to the individual, communalness describes a complex organization of numerous individuals which on a higher level is tightly connected to each other. Such an organization would maybe have the same intimate awareness of its own existence as a whole as people have consciousness of their own bodies.

See also
 Collective consciousness
 Collective identity
 Collective intelligence
 Collective memory
 Group mind (science fiction)
 Hormonal sentience
 Neurohacking

External links
 Xenopsychology by Robert A. Freitas Jr.

Science fiction themes
Consciousness
Superorganisms
Emergence